Marguerite Olagnier (née Joly) (1844 – 12 September 1906) was a French vocalist, composer and poet who began her musical life singing at the Théâtre des Variétées in Paris.

Career
While traveling in Egypt with her husband Eugène Olagnier, it is believed that she wrote both words and music of an "exotic opera" in four acts, Le Saïs, which "aimed at the fantasies and desires of women." It was staged at the Théâtre de la Renaissance in Paris on 18 December 1881 and was later performed by Victor Capoul, an Opéra-Comique tenor.

Later in life she directed her own company, the Théâtre de l'Oratorio, in weekly performances of 18th- and 19th-century oratorios. Olagnier also composed a number of songs and two more operas, Le Persan and Lilipa, which were never performed. Her only known novel was never finished.

References

External links
 Le Sais digitized online by GoogleBooks
 Henson, Karen: "Victor Capoul, Marguerite Olagnier's Le Sais, and the Arousing of Female Desire", in Journal of the American Musicological Society, vol. 52, no. 3 (October 1999), pp. 419–463.

1844 births
1906 deaths
19th-century classical composers
19th-century French composers
19th-century French women singers
19th-century women composers
Women opera composers
French women classical composers
French opera composers
Theatre directors from Paris